The Magazine of American History was established in January 1877 by Martha Joanna Lamb, Nathan Gillett Pond and John Austin Stevens with the long title The Magazine of American History with Notes and Queries.  It was issued monthly. The first seven volumes were published by the A. S. Barnes Company of New York and Chicago, volumes 8 through 28 by the Historical Publication Co., and, after Mrs. Lamb's death, the final two volumes of the initial series by the Magazine of American History Company.  It lasted into its 30th volume; the last of the three numbers in that volume was issued in September 1893. In addition to scholarly articles, and answers to readers' queries it also included original documents such as the letters of George Washington, and diary extracts from various Revolutionary War figures.

In 1901 a continuation using the shorter title was begun in Mount Vernon, NY with the middle of the 30th volume. It lasted through the 46th volume in 1917.

References
various issues of the magazine itself
Union List of Serials, 3rd edition, 1965, vol. 3
 The Magazine of American History archive at HathiTrust

External links
Archived Magazine of American History on the Internet Archive

History magazines published in the United States
Monthly magazines published in the United States
Defunct magazines published in the United States
Magazines established in 1877
Magazines established in 1917
1877 establishments in the United States